Michael Thomas Gibson (born November 18, 1985) is a former American football guard. He was drafted by the Philadelphia Eagles in the sixth round of the 2008 NFL Draft. He played college football at California.

Gibson also played for the Seattle Seahawks and Arizona Cardinals.

Early years
Gibson played high school football at Napa High School where he was Second-team All-State player and the Monticello Empire League's Lineman of the Year.

College career
Following high school, he attended and played for Solano Community College where he was All-Bay Valley Conference and an All-American.  He transferred to University of California, Berkeley in 2006 and All-Pacific-10 Conference Honorable Mention for Cal his senior year.

Professional career

First stint with Eagles
Gibson was drafted by the Philadelphia Eagles in the sixth round of the 2008 NFL Draft. During the 2008 preseason, he sustained a shoulder injury and was placed on injured reserve for the remainder of the year. He was waived on September 5, 2009. He was re-signed to their practice squad on September 6.

Seattle Seahawks
Gibson was signed off of the Eagles practice squad on October 21, 2009 by the Seattle Seahawks. He played in his first NFL game on December 20 against the Tampa Bay Buccaneers.  He started for the Seahawks in their 2010 season opening game against the San Francisco 49ers on September 12. He was waived on September 28, 2010, but later re-signed to the team's practice squad. He was promoted to the active roster on October 3, 2010, made 8 starts at right guard, and played in a total of 14 regular season games during the season.  He also started the NFC wild card playoff game against New Orleans and the divisional playoff game against Chicago.  He was released by the team on September 3 before the start of the 2011 NFL Season.

On December 7, 2011, Gibson was re-signed by the Seattle Seahawks after Russell Okung was placed on the injured reserve.

Second stint with Eagles
Gibson was re-signed to a two-year contract with the Eagles on March 15, 2012, after his contract with Seattle expired.

He was released by the Eagles on December 16, 2012.

Arizona Cardinals
The Arizona Cardinals signed Gibson on December 17, 2012. He played in 16 games for the Cardinals in 2013.

References

External links
Philadelphia Eagles bio
Seattle Seahawks bio

1985 births
Living people
People from Napa, California
Players of American football from California
American football offensive guards
American football offensive tackles
California Golden Bears football players
Philadelphia Eagles players
Seattle Seahawks players
Sportspeople from the San Francisco Bay Area
Arizona Cardinals players